Break, Break, Break is a 1914 American silent short film directed by Harry A. Pollard. A period drama written by Sydney Ayres, the film starred William Garwood and Louise Lester.

It was described by Moving Picture World shortly after its release:A pretty picture telling an idyillic love story; it should go very well; for, though it depends on sentiment rather than on thrilling dramatic suspense, it holds the attention strongly and is filled with the atmosphere of the good, old-time stories and poems. The costumes are of the mid-Victorian period in rural England. Many of its scenes are as charming as good pictures. The acting is also excellent quality. Vivian Rich is the heroine; Harry Von Meter, the hero, and Jack Richardson, the light villain. Much of the action is among the hay fields and then the seashore.

Break, Break, Break was a single-reel film produced by the American Film Manufacturing Company and released on September 9, 1914 through the Mutual Film Corporation,  which distributed 58 prints.

Cast

 B. Reeves Eason as Grandfather Day
 William Garwood as Tom Day, a son of the People
 Louise Lester as Mary Elizabeth Day, Tom's mother
 Jack Richardson as Dan Moore, a son of the Rich
 Vivian Rich as June, the adopted daughter
 Harry von Meter as Squire Moore, wealth land owner

References

External links

 

1914 films
Silent American drama films
American silent short films
American black-and-white films
Films based on works by Alfred, Lord Tennyson
Films directed by Harry A. Pollard
1914 drama films
1914 short films
American Film Company films
Mutual Film films
1910s American films